Luccombe Chine is a geological feature and visitor attraction south of the village of Luccombe on the Isle of Wight, England. A wooded coastal ravine, one of a number of such chines on the island created by stream erosion of soft Cretaceous rocks, it leads from the clifftop to Luccombe Bay.

The Chine is at the eastern end of the Isle of Wight Undercliff landslip. A small fishing community existed at the foot of the Chine until 1910, when the settlement was destroyed by a landslip. There were previously steps down to the beach from the clifftop coastal path, but these are now (as of 2017) closed due to erosion and landslips.

References

External links
Walk to Luccombe Chine and beach, Isle of Wight Attractions, retrieved 3 August 2008

Chines of the Isle of Wight